The Mecklenburg Lake Plateau or Mecklenburg Lakeland (German: Mecklenburger / Mecklenburgische Seenplatte or Seenland) is the largest coherent lake and canal region in Germany and is sometimes called "the land of a thousand lakes". There are several nature parks and well-known lakes with unique flora and fauna in the region, such as the Müritz, the biggest German lake lying entirely within Germany, the Plauer See, the Fleesensee, the Tollensesee, the Schmaler Luzin and the Kölpinsee.

Important towns of the region are Neubrandenburg, Neustrelitz, Waren, Röbel, Teterow, Malchow, Mirow and Plau am See.

Geography 

The Mecklenburg Lake District is situated in the central and southern part of the state of Mecklenburg-Western Pomerania, mostly in historical region of Mecklenburg. In the south it crosses the border of the state Brandenburg. Hence it is also known as the Mecklenburg-Brandenburg Lake District.

Like the Pomeranian and Masurian lake plateaux, the Mecklenburg Lake District was formed about 12,000 years ago from the glacial meltwater valleys (urstromtäler) and sandar of the last ice age. The main terminal moraine of the Pomeranian stage of the Weichselian, the ridge that runs from Eberswalde-Chorin through Feldberg, Mecklenburg Switzerland to the Kühlung ridge near Kühlungsborn, borders the lakeland to the north.

The lakeland can be roughly divided as follows:

On Brandenburg territory the lakeland continues into the Uckermark and Rheinsberg Lake Region.

The area in and around the Mecklenburg Lake District is partly hilly but mostly flat, sparsely populated and mainly covered by forests, lakes and marshes. The lakes themselves are popular for recreation, boating, fishing and several water sport activities. They are a natural habitat for numerous plants and animals, including endangered species.

History 
The lakeland was already settled around 10,000 B.C. by huntsmen and fishermen. From 4,000 B.C. the first farming communities were established, leaving behind megalithic tombs.

In the 4th and 5th centuries, the Germanic settlers of the region migrated south and were replaced from the 7th century by West Slavs (historically known as Wends), who intermingled with the population that had stayed behind.

From the 12th century, the influence of German settlers increased.

For a few years the area was a member of the European Geoparks Network and the Global Network of National Geoparks but as at 2011 it no longer possesses that status.

Natural regions 
The designated natural regions in the Mecklenburg Lake District are the Müritz National Park, with Germany's second-largest lake, as well as the wildlife reserves of Feldberg Lake District Nature Park, Mecklenburg Switzerland and Lake Kummerow Nature Park and the Nossentiner/Schwinzer Heath Nature Park.

See also 
 :Category:Lakes of Mecklenburg-Vorpommern

References

External links 

Mecklenburg Lakes - Land of a thousand lakes

 
Regions of Mecklenburg-Western Pomerania
Geography of Mecklenburg
North German Plain